Michael George William Lewis (born 22 October 1981) is an Indonesian actor and model. His father is a Canadian diplomat, while his mother is of Chinese-Malaysian descent. When he was still in high school, Lewis' father was stationed at the Canadian embassy in Jakarta. As of 2018, Lewis resides in the Indonesian capital.

Career
Besides working for several Indonesian agencies, Lewis also works for Specs Model Management Agency in Montreal, Canada, and as a staff member of the Canadian embassy in Indonesia. In 2003, he got his first big-screen role in the Indonesian film 5 Sehat 4 Sempurna. He was named "The Sexiest Cosmo Man" by Cosmopolitan magazine for two years in a row, in 2004 and 2005.

Asia's Next Top Model, season 4
Lewis took part in the fourth season of Asia's Next Top Model in 2016.

Filmography

Film
 5 Sehat 4 Sempurna (2002)
 Suster Ngesot (2007)
 The God Babe (2010)
 Hafalan Shalat Delisa (2011)
 Dead Mine (2012)
 Suka Suka Super Seven dan Idola Cilik dalam (2014)
 Habis Gelap Menuju Terang (2014)
 The Night Comes for Us (2018)
 Message Man (2018)
 Foxtrot Six (2019)

Television
 Cinta Jangan Buru-Buru (2007)
 Cinta Fitri (2007)
 Bunga (2007)
 Yasmin (2008)
 Larasati (2008)
 Dia atau Diriku (2011)
 Putih Abu-Abu (2012)
 Cinta Bersemi di Putih Abu-Abu the Series (2012)
 Cowokku Superboy (2014)
 Ganteng Ganteng Serigala (2014)

References

External links
 

1981 births
Living people
Indo people
Indonesian male film actors
Indonesian male television actors
Indonesian male models
Indonesian people of Canadian descent
Indonesian people of Chinese descent
Canadian emigrants to Indonesia
Malaysian emigrants to Indonesia
Indonesian people of Malaysian descent
People from Tokyo
People from Jakarta